Abd Manaf (Arabic: عبْد مناف, ‘abd manāf) is a theophoric Arabic name that means "servant of Manaf", Manaf being one of the pre-Islamic polytheistic gods. In modern usage the form Abdul Manaf (Arabic: عبْدُ ٱلْمناف, ‘abdu ’l-manāf) is also found.

Abd Manaf may refer to:
Wahb ibn Abd Manaf
Muttalib ibn Abd Manaf
Hashim ibn Abd Manaf (c. 464–497)
Abd Shams ibn Abd Manaf
Umayya ibn Abd Manaf
Abdul Manaf Mamat

See also
List of Arabic theophoric names

Arabic masculine given names
Arabic-language surnames